The A357 is a road that leads from Blandford to Wincanton. In combination with the A350 and A371, it forms the main route between Blandford and Poole and Weston-super-Mare, of which it is the intermediate segment.

There have been calls for traffic calming measures at Sturminster Newton, regarding a perception of many vehicles exceeding the speed limit. Between August 2011 and August 2016, there were 2 slight injuries due to road traffic accidents on the stretch. There have been fatal accidents on the stretch of road near Blandford.

References

Roads in England